Iuliia Budaleeva also known as Iuliia Chokhlaeva (born 13 November 1990) is a Russian female visually impaired cross-country skier and biathlete. She represented Russia at the 2014 Winter Paralympics and was successful in her maiden Paralympic competition, claiming four medals including a gold medal in the biathlon event. Iuliia Budaleeva was awarded the Order of Friendship by the Russian president, Vladimir Putin for her performance at the 2014 Winter Paralympics.

Career 
Iuliia Budaleeva competed at the 2014 Winter Paralympics with her guide Tatiana Maltseva and went onto claim 3 medals in the biathlon events including a gold medal in the women's 12.5km biathletes event and two silver medals in women's 6km event and women's 10km event. She also clinched a bronze medal in the women's 5km cross-country skiing event as a part of the 2014 Winter Paralympics.

Personal life 
Iuliia Budaleeva married fellow Russian visually impaired Paralympic Nordic skier, Stanislav Chokhlaev. Stanislav Chokhlaev also competed at the 2014 Winter Paralympics and excelled at his maiden Paralympic event similar to that of his wife by claiming two silver medals in the cross-country skiing and a bronze medal in biathlon events.

References 

1990 births
Living people
Russian female biathletes
Russian female cross-country skiers
Cross-country skiers at the 2014 Winter Paralympics
Biathletes at the 2014 Winter Paralympics
Paralympic cross-country skiers of Russia
Paralympic biathletes of Russia
Paralympic gold medalists for Russia
Paralympic silver medalists for Russia
Paralympic bronze medalists for Russia
Medalists at the 2014 Winter Paralympics
Russian blind people
Paralympic medalists in cross-country skiing
Paralympic medalists in biathlon
21st-century Russian women